Hypergranulosis is an increased thickness of the stratum granulosum. It is seen in skin diseases with epidermal hyperplasia and orthokeratotic hyperkeratosis.

See also
 Skin lesion
 Skin disease
 List of skin diseases

References

Dermatologic terminology